The Orange County Waves was a professional women's soccer team, based in Orange County, California. The team began play in 2011, won the Women's Premier Soccer League (WPSL) National Championship and then folded at the end of its first season.

History
Orange County Waves was one of two professional teams founded for the 2011 Women's Premier Soccer League (WPSL) by the same team of investors; alongside the Bay Area Breeze, based in Northern California.

Originally conceived as Orange County Sol, the team aimed to be a continuation of the defunct Women's Professional Soccer (WPS) franchise Los Angeles Sol. Anschutz Entertainment Group, rightholders of the Sol name, blocked its use for the new teams.

Former Sol coach Abner Rogers was recruited as well as several ex-Sol players. It was intended that the Waves would progress to WPS, then the top level of professional women's football in the United States. Experienced Ajax America Women coach Brian Boswell joined as assistant to Rogers, who flew to the 2011 Algarve Cup to scout for players. A strong squad was assembled, comprising professionals except for five amateur players who needed to preserve their college soccer eligibility.

The team won the national WPSL Championship in its only season of existence, beating Chicago Red Stars 2–1 after extra time in the final. Rogers was named Coach of the Year. In December 2011 the team's owners withdrew funding from Orange County Waves, in order to focus their attentions on Bay Area Breeze.

2011 squad

Year-by-year

References

External links
 

Women's soccer clubs in the United States
Women's Premier Soccer League teams
Association football clubs disestablished in 2011
Association football clubs established in 2011
Defunct soccer clubs in California
2011 disestablishments in California
2011 establishments in California